Jalbert is the surname of:

 David Jalbert (folk musician) (born 1980), Canadian folk musician and singer-songwriter
 Domina Jalbert (1904–1991), invented the ram-air inflated flexible wing often called the "Jalbert parafoil"
 Dominic Jalbert (born 1989), Canadian ice hockey defenceman
 Jay Jalbert (born 1977), American lacrosse player 
 Laurence Jalbert (born 1959), Canadian pop singer-songwriter
 Pierre Jalbert (1925–2014), Canadian skier, actor, and motion picture film and sound editor
 René Marc Jalbert (1921–1996), Canadian soldier and sergeant-at-arms of the National Assembly of Quebec

See also
 Val-Jalbert, ghost town in Quebec

French-language surnames